Eastbury Park was a country estate near Tarrant Gunville in Dorset, England. It contained a large mansion designed by Sir John Vanbrugh. The mansion has not survived, but its former service wing has become a country house known as Eastbury House, a Grade I listed building.

History
The house was designed by Vanbrugh for George Dodington, who was Secretary to the Treasurer of the Navy. Construction started in 1718 and was completed under the stewardship of Dodington's nephew, George Dodington, 1st Baron Melcombe, in 1738 at a final cost £140,000: it had a large garden which was designed by Charles Bridgeman. The house was inherited by Richard Grenville-Temple, 2nd Earl Temple in 1762, who had no use for it, and he had it demolished in 1782.

The service wing, designed by Vanbrugh and built at the same time as the rest of the mansion, survived the demolition and became known as Eastbury House. It became a Grade I listed building in 1955. The parklands are Grade II* listed in the National Register of Historic Parks and Gardens.

References

Country houses in Dorset
Grade I listed buildings in Dorset
Houses completed in 1738
John Vanbrugh buildings
Grade II* listed parks and gardens in Dorset